Ralf Sievers (born 30 October 1961) is a German former professional footballer who played as a midfielder, most notably with Eintracht Frankfurt.

Career
Like his brother Jörg he began his career at Lower Saxon club SV Eddelstorf. From 1982 until 1991, Sievers played 232 matches in the Bundesliga for Eintracht Frankfurt and FC St.Pauli, scoring ten goals. From 1991 until 1993 he appeared in 44 fixtures for St.Pauli (one goal) in the 2. Bundesliga. 1988 was his most successful season. With Frankfurt he won the 1987–88 DFB-Pokal on 28 May 1988 and was part of the German olympic team that won the bronze medal at the Summer Olympics in Seoul.

His brother Jörg was goalkeeper with Hannover 96 where he is goalkeeping coach from 2003 until 2020.

Trivia 
His nickname Colt Sievers derives from The Fall Guy character Colt Seavers.

Honours
Eintracht Frankfurt
DFB-Pokal: 1987–88

References

External links
 Ralf Sievers at eintracht-archiv.de

1961 births
Living people
People from Lüneburg
Footballers from Lower Saxony
German footballers
Association football midfielders
Lüneburger SK players
Eintracht Frankfurt players
FC St. Pauli players
Germany youth international footballers
Olympic footballers of West Germany
West German footballers
Footballers at the 1988 Summer Olympics
Olympic bronze medalists for West Germany
Bundesliga players
2. Bundesliga players
Olympic medalists in football
Medalists at the 1988 Summer Olympics